is a Japanese professional baseball pitcher who is currently a free agent. He has played in Nippon Professional Baseball (NPB) for the Tokyo Yakult Swallows.

On December 2, 2020, he become free agent.

References

External links

 NPB.com

1991 births
Living people
Baseball people from Wakayama Prefecture
Japanese baseball players
Nippon Professional Baseball pitchers
Tokyo Yakult Swallows players